Slow Horses is a spy thriller television series based on the Slough House series of novels by Mick Herron. The series premiered on Apple TV+ on 1 April 2022. Season two premiered on 2 December 2022. In June 2022, the series was renewed for third and fourth seasons. It has received critical acclaim.

Premise
Slough House is an administrative purgatory for MI5 service rejects who have bungled their job but have not been sacked. Those consigned there are known as "Slow Horses".  They are expected to endure dull, paper-pushing tasks, along with occasional mental abuse from their miserable boss, Jackson Lamb, who expects them to quit out of boredom or frustration. Life in Slough House is defined by drudgery. Yet the Slow Horses somehow get involved investigating schemes endangering Britain.

Cast

Main
 Gary Oldman as Jackson Lamb, the head of Slough House. Slovenly, rude, and apparently drunk most of the time. His bad habits belie a mind still keen and devious and his abilities as an experienced intelligence officer.
 Jack Lowden as River Cartwright, an up-and-coming MI5 agent shunted aside to Slough House after a very public training exercise mistake.
 Kristin Scott Thomas as Diana Taverner, the Deputy Director-General of MI5 and head of operations and designated "Second Desk".

Slough House

Except as noted, each character has appeared in all seasons so far shown.

 Saskia Reeves as Catherine Standish, the office administrator and a recovering alcoholic.
 Olivia Cooke as Sidonie "Sid" Baker (season 1), a competent MI5 agent inexplicably assigned to Slough House, to watch over River.
 Rosalind Eleazar as Louisa Guy, assigned after a tail operation went badly.
 Christopher Chung as Roddy Ho, an obnoxious computer expert and former hacktivist.
 Steven Waddington as Jed Moody (season 1), an ex-member of "The Dogs", an MI5 internal affairs and tactical unit.
 Dustin Demri-Burns as Min Harper (seasons 1–2), assigned after leaving a top-secret disk on the train.
 Paul Higgins as Struan Loy (season 1), assigned after sending an inappropriate work email.
 Aimee-Ffion Edwards as Shirley Dander (season 2), who has anger issues.
 Kadiff Kirwan as Marcus Longridge (season 2), who has gambling issues.

Others

Notable other characters appearing in more than one season include:

 Jonathan Pryce as David Cartwright, River Cartwright's grandfather, a retired MI5 officer.
 Chris Reilly as Nick Duffy, head of MI5's internal affairs and tactical unit nicknamed "The Dogs".
 Samuel West as Peter Judd MP, a rising right-wing Conservative politician (season 1) and later Home Secretary (season 2). 
 Sophie Okonedo as Ingrid Tearney (season 1, expected to appear in season 3), the Director-General of MI5, often referred to as "First Desk".
 Freddie Fox as James "Spider" Webb, an MI5 agent based at Regent’s Park headquarters.

Notable other characters appearing in Season 1 - Slow Horses include:

 Antonio Aakeel as Hassan Ahmed, Leeds University student kidnapped by the Sons of Albion
 Paul Hilton as Robert Hobden, a disgraced and struggling journalist with ties to extremist far-right groups.
 Sam Hazeldine as Moe, the leader of the Sons of Albion, an extremist far-right group, with a secret to hide. 
 Brian Vernel as Curly, a fanatical member of the Sons of Albion.
 Stephen Walters as Zeppo, a member of the Sons of Albion. 
 David Walmsley as Larry, a member of the Sons of Albion. 
 James Faulkner as Charles Partner (in flashbacks), a former Director-General of MI5 during the Cold War, whom Standish worked for as his PA. 

Notable other characters appearing in Season 2 - Dead Lions include:
 Rade Serbedzija as Nikolai Katinsky, a former KGB agent living in exile in London after defecting at the end of the Cold War.
 Marek Vašut as Andre Chernitsky, a former KGB operative and assassin who operated during the Cold War.
 Alec Utgoff as Arkady Pashkin, a fixer for oligarch Ilya Nevsky.
 Catherine McCormack as Alex Tropper, a local resident in the small village of Upshott, the wife of Duncan and mother of Kelly.
 Adrian Rawlins as Duncan Tropper, a pub owner in Upshott, the husband of Alex and father of Kelly. 
 Tamsin Topolski as Kelly Tropper, a pub barmaid in Upshott and the daughter of Alex and Duncan.
 Phil Davis as Richard Bough, aka Dickie Bow, a former MI5 officer, who is disgraced and long since retired.

Episodes

Series overview

Season 1 (2022): Slow Horses

Season 2 (2022): Dead Lions

Production
The series was given a straight to series order by Apple TV+ in October 2019, with Gary Oldman announced to star. The cast was rounded out in December 2020 with the additions of Olivia Cooke, Jonathan Pryce, Kristin Scott Thomas and Jack Lowden. Initially the series was to consist of two seasons, but two additional seasons have since been ordered. Each season has been based on an individual book in the Slough House series.

Filming of the first season began on 30 November 2020, in England, and continued into February 2021, with Gary Oldman and Kristin Scott Thomas spotted on set in Westminster, London. In July 2021, filming continued in Stroud, Gloucestershire. It was originally intended to film earlier in 2020 but was delayed due to the COVID-19 pandemic.

In June 2022, ahead of the second season premiere, the series was renewed for third and fourth seasons, which will be based on the next novels in the series, Real Tigers and Spook Street. Saul Metzstein has been announced as the director of season 3. , filming of Season 3 had been completed and filming of Season 4 was about to begin.

The title track "Strange Game" was performed by Rolling Stones frontman Mick Jagger, who wrote the song exclusively for the show together with the show’s composer Daniel Pemberton.

Reception
The first season received critical acclaim. Rotten Tomatoes reports a 95% approval rating with an average rating of 7.7/10, based on 55 critic reviews. The website's critics consensus reads, "Slow Horses refreshes the espionage genre by letting its band of snoops be bumbling, with Gary Oldman giving a masterclass in frumpy authority." On the review aggregator Metacritic, the season has a weighted average score of 78 out of 100 based on 22 critics, indicating "generally favorable reviews".

The second season also received critical acclaim. Rotten Tomatoes reports a 100% approval rating with an average rating of 8.4/10, based on 25 critic reviews. The website's critical consensus says, "Slow Horses says nay to the sophomore jinx with a second season that might be even better than its supremely addictive predecessor." On Metacritic, the season has a weighted average score of 84 out of 100 based on 10 critics, indicating "universal acclaim".

References

External links
 
 

2022 British television series debuts
2020s British drama television series
British thriller television series
Television shows filmed in England
Television productions postponed due to the COVID-19 pandemic
Apple TV+ original programming
Television shows based on British novels
Television series by Sony Pictures Television
English-language television shows
MI5 in fiction
Spy thriller television series
Espionage television series